Inmaculle Naberaho (born 14 June 1973) is a Rwandan long-distance runner. She competed in the women's 3000 metres at the 1992 Summer Olympics.

References

1973 births
Living people
Athletes (track and field) at the 1992 Summer Olympics
Rwandan female long-distance runners
Olympic athletes of Rwanda
Place of birth missing (living people)